Redhill Academy is a secondary school and sixth form with academy status, situated on Redhill Road in Arnold, Nottinghamshire, England.

The school has around 1,575 pupils, 360 of which are sixth form AS/A2 level students. The head teacher is Mike Hardy.

Academic performance
The school teaches GCSE and A level. In 2008, Redhill Academy was confirmed as a high performing specialist school, specializing in science and performing arts and containing exceptional scientific and theatrical courses.

2008 also saw the academy becoming rated ‘outstanding’ by Ofsted. Redhill Academy is now a Lead Partner School. Last inspected 2013 resulted in a second 'outstanding' rating.

The Redhill Academy Trust

Staff and chair
•Andrew Burns (executive principal)
•Steve Hopkins (chair of the Redhill Academy Trust)
•Mike Hardy (HeadTeacher
Of the Redhill Academy Trust))

Sponsoring

Sherwood E-ACT Academy (Formerly sponsored by E-ACT) (until 2016, when the Academy will close permanently)
The Carlton Academy 
Hall Park Academy (since 2014)
Forest High School (since 2014)
Big Wood School (since 2015)

See also
Department for Education (DfE)
Carlton Academy

References

External links

Redhill Academy at EduBase
Redhill Academy Trust statutory information

Academies in Nottinghamshire
Secondary schools in Nottinghamshire